Plicisyrinx decapitata is a species of sea snail, a marine gastropod mollusk in the family Pseudomelatomidae, the turrids and allies.

Description

Distribution
This marine species was found in the Kurile-Kamchatka Trench, Northern Pacific Ocean.

References

 Kantor, Yu I., and A. V. Sysoev. "A new Genus and new Species from the Family Turridae (Gastropoda, Toxoglossa) in the northern Part of the  Pacific Ocean." Zoologichesky Zhurnal 65.4 (1986): 485-498.

External links
 

decapitata
Gastropods described in 1986